The Zeeheldenkwartier (literally Sea Heroes Quarter) is a neighbourhood in the Centrum district of The Hague, Netherlands. It is bordered by the Carnegielaan, the Zeestraat, the Hoge Wal and the Prinsessewal to the north-east, the Veenkade to the south, the Waldeck Pyrmontkade to the south-west and the Laan van Meerdervoort to the Carnegielaan to the north. Built between 1870 and 1890, the style of the buildings differs between larger houses for important officials near the Willemspark and the Laan van Meerdervoort, and predominantly smaller houses nearer to the city centre. It has also the most Coffeeshops in town. And it has from Albert Heijn the biggest supermarket in town called “Albert Heijn XL”.

References

External links
  Official website
 ZeeheldenNieuws, News about the Zeeheldenkwartier

Neighbourhoods of The Hague